Habib the Carpenter, or Habib Al-Najjar, was, according to the belief of some Muslims, a martyr who lived in Antioch at the time of Jesus Christ. In Muslim tradition, Habib believed the message of Christ's disciples sent to the People of Ya-Sin, and was subsequently martyred for his faith. The Mosque of Habib-i Neccar (Ottoman for Habib al-Najjar), below Mount Silpius, contains the tomb of Habib along with that of Sham'un Al-Safa (Peter, also known as Simon the Pure). Some sources have identified Habib with Saint Agabus of the Acts of the Apostles, an early Christian who suffered martyrdom in Antioch at the time of Jesus. This connection is disputed, as Christian tradition holds that Agabus was martyred at Jerusalem, and not at Antioch as Muslims believe of Habib. All Muslim sources list Habib's occupation as a carpenter.

Historical narrative
Although Habib is not mentioned in the Qur'an, an old Muslim tradition speaks of some of Christ's disciples, including John, Jude and Peter, who were sent to town of Antioch to preach the faith of God. The people of Antioch had regressed to idolatry. When the disciples came, many of the people questioned them, asking them of what religion Jesus had sent them to preach. Baidawi provided a detailed account of Habib's narrative. He related that the disciples met Habib in Antioch and made known to him their mission. Baidawi further related that the disciples, by the will of God, performed various miracles including healing the sick and blind. After Habib's son was healed, Habib's faith was further strengthened and he tried to help in preaching the Gospel to his fellow people. Yet still, many refused to hear God's message. Instead, the disbelievers decided to stone Habib to death. The legend ends with Habib, upon having been stoned, entering paradise as a martyr.

In the Quran
The legend of Habib the martyr was, by early Quran commentators, identified with the following verse of the Quran:

The people who are described as preaching to the town in the Qur'anic verse are mentioned as 'messengers'. Therefore, the identification  of Christ's disciples and Habib with the figures in the Qur'anic verse is believed to be false by many modern commentators. This is because the term 'Messenger' or 'Apostle' usually denotes a Prophet in the Qur'an, unlike the New Testament which describes some disciples of Jesus as apostles. Many people translate Rasulullah as 'Apostle of God'. Some sources have identified Habib with the Prophet Agabus of Acts of the Apostles.

See also

 Islamic view of Jesus
 Disciples of Jesus in Islam

Further reading
 Chronique de Tabari (Bal'ami), trans. H. Zotenberg, ii, 51f.
 Tabari, Volume 1, 789–783; Tafsir Tabari, xxii, 91ff.
  Masudi, Murudj, i, 127f. (trans. Ch. Pellat, Paris, 1962, i, 127)

References

Muslim martyrs
Legendary Islamic people
AD 5 births
1st-century deaths
Carpenters